Steady Company may refer to:

 Steady Company (1915 film), a silent drama film
 Steady Company (1932 film), an American action film